South Bedfordshire was, from 1974 to 2009, a non-metropolitan district of Bedfordshire, in the East of England. Its main towns were Dunstable, Houghton Regis and Leighton Buzzard.

Creation
The district was formed on 1 April 1974 as part of a general reorganisation of local authorities in England and Wales carried out under the Local Government Act 1972. South Bedfordshire was formed by the amalgamation of three former districts which were all abolished at the same time:
Dunstable Municipal Borough;
Leighton-Linslade Urban District; and
Luton Rural District.

Premises
The council initially used the former Dunstable Borough Council offices at Grove House in Dunstable as its headquarters, but also continued to use the former Leighton-Linslade offices at the White House in Leighton Buzzard and the former Luton Rural District Council offices on Sundon Road in Houghton Regis. A new headquarters for the council was built in 1989 on the site of the former Dunstable North railway station, called the District Council Offices. Following the council's abolition in 2009 the building was used as a secondary office by Central Bedfordshire Council, being renamed as Watling House.

Civil parishes
The district comprised the following civil parishes:
Barton-le-Clay
Caddington
Chalton
Dunstable (Town)
Eaton Bray
Heath and Reach
Houghton Regis (Town) 
Hockliffe
Hyde
Leighton-Linslade (Town)
Kensworth
Slip End
Stanbridge
Streatley
Studham
Sundon
Toddington
Totternhoe
Whipsnade

Elections and political control

The first election to South Bedfordshire District Council took place on 7 June 1973, with the 45 councillors elected forming a shadow authority until 1 April 1974. Following ward boundary changes, the number of councillors was increased to 53, with an election of the whole council held in 1976. The council resolved to hold elections by thirds thereafter. Councillors had a four-year term of office, and one third of the council was elected in three years out of four. Elections to Bedfordshire County Council took place in years that there were none to the district council. In 2002 the wards were again redrawn, and the size of the council was reduced to 50 members. An election of the whole council was held on the new boundaries. The electoral cycle continued by thirds in later years. The elections due to take place in May 2008 were cancelled, with councillors staying in office until the abolition of the council in 2009.

The first council elected was under no overall control, with the Conservative Party having the largest number of councillors. The party dominated the council for most of its existence, gaining a majority in 1976 which they held until 1995. In 1996 they were supplanted by the Labour Party as the largest grouping on the council, in a year that saw a strong vote against the unpopular Conservative government of John Major. In 1999 the Liberal Democrats briefly became the largest group on the council, which remained under no overall control. The Conservatives staged a recovery in 2000, taking 10 seats from Labour and the Liberal Democrats, and again gaining a plurality of councillors. They subsequently regained their majority, which they held until the council's abolition.

† New ward boundaries

Coat of arms
On 27 November 1976 South Bedfordshire District Council was granted armorial bearings by the College of Arms. The arms combined elements from the devices of the three merged councils, and were blazoned as follows:
Or a pile gules over all a single-arched bridge throughout argent masoned sable the keystone charged with an ear of wheat between on the pile three sickles proper all within a bordure engrailed sable; and for a Crest on a wreath of the colours out of a mural crown argent masoned sable in front of a demi-Bull three cog-wheels in fesse Or; and for a Badge or Device: Upon a roundel embattled gules irradiated with rays of the sun a demi-bull rampant couped Or.

The gold and red colouring was derived from the arms of the Bedfordshire County Council. The triangular "pile" and black engrailed border around the shield came from the device of Dunstable Borough Council, itself based on the arms of Dunstable Priory. The bridge across the centre of the shield was from the arms of Leighton Linslade UDC, and the sickles from those of Luton RDC. The crest above the shield was a gold bull, one of the supporters of the county council arms. The motto of Leighton-Linslade, "By Truth and Dilgence" was adopted.

Abolition
In 2006 the Department for Communities and Local Government considered reorganising Bedfordshire's administrative structure as part of the 2009 structural changes to local government in England. On 6 March 2008 it was announced that South Bedfordshire would merge with Mid Bedfordshire to form a new unitary authority called Central Bedfordshire. The new council was formed on 1 April 2009.

References 

Local government in Bedfordshire
Geography of Bedfordshire
English districts abolished in 2009
Former non-metropolitan districts of Bedfordshire
Central Bedfordshire District